Dušan Rajović (born 19 November 1997) is a Serbian cyclist, who currently rides for UCI WorldTeam .

Major results

2014
 National Junior Road Championships
1st  Road race
1st  Time trial
 1st Overall Memorial Dimitr Yankov
1st Stages 1 & 2
 1st Overall Belgrade Trophy Milan Panić
1st Stages 1 & 2
2015
 National Junior Road Championships
1st  Road race
1st  Time trial
 1st Stage 4 Grand Prix Rüebliland
2016
 1st  Time trial, National Road Championships
 5th Belgrade–Banja Luka II
 7th Belgrade–Banja Luka I
2017
 1st  Time trial, National Road Championships
 1st Croatia–Slovenia
 1st Stage 2 Tour of Qinghai Lake
 3rd Belgrade–Banja Luka I
 3rd Belgrade–Banja Luka II
2018
 1st  Road race, National Road Championships
 1st GP Izola
 1st Croatia–Slovenia
 1st Stage 10 Tour of Qinghai Lake
 3rd Poreč Trophy
 3rd Umag Trophy
 10th GP Laguna
2019
 1st  Road race, National Road Championships
 1st International Rhodes Grand Prix
 1st Stage 4 CRO Race
 1st Stage 1 Tour of Rhodes
 1st Stage 2a (ITT) Tour of Bihor
2020
 4th Overall Tour of Serbia
1st Stage 3
2021
 1st  Road race, National Road Championships
2022
 National Road Championships
1st  Road race
1st  Time trial
 1st Poreč Trophy
 Vuelta Ciclista a Venezuela
1st Stages 2 & 7
 1st Stage 2 Vuelta al Táchira
 1st Stage 2 Tour of Antalya
 3rd Umag Trophy
 9th Grand Prix Justiniano Hotels

References

External links

1997 births
Living people
Serbian male cyclists
European Games competitors for Serbia
Cyclists at the 2019 European Games
Sportspeople from Kraljevo
Competitors at the 2018 Mediterranean Games
Mediterranean Games competitors for Serbia
21st-century Serbian people
Competitors at the 2022 Mediterranean Games